Arkansas Highway 49 may refer to:
Arkansas Highway 49 (1926-1963), now numbered 20
U.S. Route 49 in Arkansas, entered Arkansas in 1963